Tropicoporus is a genus of fungi in the family Hymenochaetaceae. It was circumscribed in 2015 with Tropicoporus excentrodendri as the type species, and six additional species transferred from Inonotus.

References

Agaricomycetes genera
Hymenochaetaceae